There have been two regimes known as Estado Novo (meaning "New State"):

Estado Novo (Portugal), or Second Republic, the Portuguese authoritarian regime between 1933 and 1974
Estado Novo (Brazil), the period from 1937 to 1945, under the leadership of Getúlio Vargas